Heinrich LXII, Prince Reuss Younger Line (31 May 178519 June 1854) was the first Prince Reuss Younger Line from 1848 to 1854, also called Reuss Junior Line and Prince of Reuss-Gera.

Early life
Heinrich LXII was born at Schleiz, Reuss, eldest surviving son of Heinrich XLII, Prince Reuss of Schleiz (1752–1818), (son of Count Heinrich XII Reuss of Schleiz, and Countess Christine of Erbach-Schönberg) and his wife, Princess Caroline of Hohenlohe-Kirchberg (1761–1849), (daughter of Christian Friedrich Karl, Prince of Hohenlohe-Kirchberg and Princess Louise Charlotte of Hohenlohe-Langenburg).

Prince Reuss Younger Line
After the abdication of Heinrich LXXII, Prince Reuss of Lobenstein and Ebersdorf in October 1848, due to civil unrest in connection with the revolutions that spread through Germany, Heinrich LXII unified the principalities of Reuss-Schleiz, Reuss-Gera, Reuss-Lobenstein and Reuss-Ebersdorf, and became part of the Principality of Reuss Younger Line. Under his government, the country received in 1849 a modern constitution. In 1851, the first constitutional parliament and in 1852 was a revised the state constitution, together with a new electoral law adopted by indirect elections. 

Heinrich LXII died unmarried and had no children, therefore, at his death, the throne of the Principality passed to his younger brother Heinrich LXVII.

Ancestry

Notes and sources
Europäische Stammtafeln, Band I, Frank Baron Freytag von Loringhoven, 1975, Isenburg, W. K. Prinz von, Reference: Page 170
L'Allemagne dynastique, Huberty, Giraud, Magdelaine, Reference: I 322

1785 births
1854 deaths
People from Schleiz
Princes of Reuss